José "Pepe" Sánchez  (born 19 January  2000) is a Spanish professional footballer who plays as a central defender for Deportivo de La Coruña, on loan from Granada CF.

Club career
Born in Linares, Jaén, Andalusia, Sánchez joined Granada CF's youth setup in 2016, after representing Real Jaén and Linares CF 2011. On 4 April 2019, while still a youth, he renewed his contract for two seasons.

Sánchez made his senior debut with the reserves on 3 November 2019, starting in a 2–1 Segunda División B away win against Recreativo de Huelva. He made his first team debut on 17 December, starting in a 3–2 away success over CE L'Hospitalet, for the season's Copa del Rey.

On 28 May 2020, Sánchez renewed his contract with the Nazaríes for a further campaign. He first appeared in the UEFA Europa League on 5 November by playing the full 90 minutes in a 2–0 away win against AC Omonia, and completed a trio of debuts three days later by starting in a 0–2 La Liga away loss against Real Sociedad.

On 27 January 2023, Sánchez was loaned to Primera Federación side Deportivo de La Coruña for the remainder of the season.

References

External links

2000 births
Living people
People from Linares, Jaén
Sportspeople from the Province of Jaén (Spain)
Spanish footballers
Footballers from Andalusia
Association football defenders
La Liga players
Segunda División players
Segunda División B players
Segunda Federación players
Club Recreativo Granada players
Granada CF footballers
Deportivo de La Coruña players